Miodrag Živković may refer to:
 Miodrag Živković (politician)
 Miodrag Živković (sculptor)